Wilfrid Merydith Capper (12 July 1905 – 27 July 1998) was a countryside campaigner in Northern Ireland. Educated at Bangor Grammar School, Methodist College, and Queen's University. Capper’s career in the forestry division of the Ministry of Agriculture fitted well with his interest in the countryside.

Whitepark Bay
In 1931, Capper was involved in the creation of a Northern Ireland branch of the youth hostel movement, the first hostel being established at Whitepark Bay in County Antrim. It was the impending threat to the bay from development that lead hostellers, including Capper to purchase the bay and present it to the National Trust.

The Ulster Way
Much of Capper's time and effort was spent in the creation of the Ulster Way, a long distance walking route connecting various areas of outstanding natural beauty.

Awards
In 1975, Capper received the MBE. He was later awarded the Sir John Hunt Award for services to the countryside for his work in establishing the Ulster Federation of Rambling Clubs.

References

1905 births
1998 deaths
People from Northern Ireland
Members of the Order of the British Empire
People educated at Methodist College Belfast
Youth hostelling
People educated at Bangor Grammar School
Alumni of Queen's University Belfast